Roger ...felde ( 1407), of Hereford, was an English politician.

He was a Member (MP) of the Parliament of England for Hereford in 1407. The first part of his surname is illegible in the surviving records. Nothing more is known of him, although he may have been related to Thomas Whitefield.

References

14th-century births
15th-century deaths
English MPs 1407
People from Hereford